The Bermuda Atlantic Time-series Study (BATS) is a long-term oceanographic study by the Bermuda Institute of Ocean Sciences (BIOS).  Based on regular (monthly or better) research cruises, it samples an area of the western Atlantic Ocean nominally at the coordinates .  The cruise programme routinely samples physical properties such as ocean temperature and salinity, but focuses on variables of biological or biogeochemical interest including: nutrients (nitrate, nitrite, phosphate and silicic acid), dissolved inorganic carbon, oxygen, HPLC of pigments, primary production and sediment trap flux.  The BATS cruises began in 1988 but are supplemented by biweekly Hydrostation "S" cruises to a neighbouring location that began in 1954.  The data collected by these cruises are available online.

Scientific Findings
Between 1998 and 2013, research conducted at BATS has generated over 450 peer-reviewed articles.  Among the findings are measurements showing the gradual acidification of the surface ocean, where surface water pH, carbonate ion concentration, and the saturation state for calcium carbonate minerals, such as aragonite, have all decreased since 1998.  Additionally, studies at BATS have shown changes in the Revelle factor, suggesting that the capacity of North Atlantic Ocean surface waters to absorb carbon dioxide has diminished, even as seawater pCO2 has kept pace with increasing atmospheric pCO2.

See also
 Hawaii Ocean Time-series (HOT)
 Weather ship

References

External links
 BATS homepage and dataserver

Aquatic ecology
Biological oceanography
Chemical oceanography
Geochemistry
Oceanography
Physical oceanography
Oceanographic Time-Series